Zugezogen Maskulin is a German rap duo, formed by grim104 and Testo in Berlin. They are signed to the Hamburg label Buback.

 means 'newcomers' and the name is a reference to the fact that both members of the group are newcomers to Berlin, as well as being an homage to previous German rap duos 'Westberlin Maskulin' and 'Südberlin Maskulin'.

History 
Grim104 and Testo formed the duo in July 2010. In 2011, the free album Kauft nicht bei Zugezogenen! (lit.: Do not buy from newcomers!) was released. The duo present themselves, like K.I.Z, as a satire of gangster rap and machoism. Many of their lyrics are sarcastic and exaggeratedly macho.
In the fall of 2013, the duo were signed by the Hamburg Independent label Buback. Buback also released grim104's self titled solo EP in November 2013.
On 13 February 2015, the group's second album was released,  (Everything Burns).

Discography 
EPs
 2010: Zugezogen Maskulin

Albums
 2011: Kauft nicht bei Zugezogenen! (Don't buy from Newcomers!)
 2015: Alles brennt (Everything Burns)
 2017: Alle gegen alle (Everybody Against Everybody)

Singles
 2014: Alles brennt (Everything burns)
 2014: Endlich wieder Krieg (Finally war again)
 2015: Plattenbau O.S.T
 2016: Ratatat im Bataclan
 2017: Was für eine Zeit
 2017: Uwe & Heiko

Videos
 2011: Entartete Kunst (Degenerate art)
 2012: Undercut Tumblrblog
 2012: Rotkohl (Red cabbage)
 2014: Alles brennt (Everything burns)
 2014: Endlich wieder Krieg (Finally war again)
 2015: Plattenbau O.S.T
 2017: Was für eine Zeit
 2017: Uwe & Heiko
 2017: Alle gegen Alle

External links 

 Zugezogen Maskulin on laut.de
 Zugezogen Maskulin on Buback

References 

German hip hop groups
German musical duos
Musical groups from Berlin
Musical groups established in 2010
Hip hop duos
2010 establishments in Germany